Alan Cline is an American computer scientist, and as of 2016 was the David Bruton, Jr. Centennial Professor #2 at the University of Texas at Austin.

References

Year of birth missing (living people)
Living people
University of Texas at Austin faculty
American computer scientists